

Baseball (2023 Nippon Baseball Professional Season)

Nippon Professional Baseball 
 Central League
 Chunichi Dragons
 Hanshin Tigers
 Hiroshima Toyo Carp
 Tokyo Yakult Swallows
 Yokohama DeNA BayStars
 Yomiuri Giants

 Pacific League
 Chiba Lotte Marines
 Fukuoka SoftBank Hawks
 Hokkaido Nippon-Ham Fighters
 Orix Buffaloes
 Saitama Seibu Lions
 Tohoku Rakuten Golden Eagles

Basketball (2022–23 B. League Season)

B.League 
B1 League
 Eastern Conference
 Akita Northern Happinets
 Alvark Tokyo
 Chiba Jets Funabashi
 Gunma Crane Thunders
 Ibaraki Robots
 Levanga Hokkaido
 Sendai 89ERS
 Utsunomiya Brex

 Central Conference
 Kawasaki Brave Thunders
 Niigata Albirex BB
 San-En Neophoenix
 Seahorses Mikawa
 Shinshu Brave Warriors 
 Sunrockers Shibuya
 Toyama Grouses
 Yokohama B-Corsairs

 Western Conference
 Hiroshima Dragonfly
 Kyoto Hannaryz
 Nagoya Diamond Dolphins
 Osaka Evessa
 Ryukyu Golden Kings
 Shiga Lakestars
 Shimane Susanoo Magic
 Toyotsu Fighting Eagles Nagoya

B2 League
 Eastern Conference
 Altiri Chiba
 Aomori Wat's
 Earthfriends Tokyo Z
 Fukushima Firebonds
 Koshigaya Alphas
 Nishinomiya Storks
 Yamagata Wyverns

 Western Conference
 Bambitious Nara
 Ehime Orange Vikings
 Kagawa Five Arrows
 Kumamoto Volters
 Nagasaki Velca
 Rising Zephyr Fukuoka
 Saga Ballooners

B3 League
 Gifu Swoops
 Iwate Big Bulls
 Kagoshima Rebnise
 Kanagawa Samuraiz
 Saitama Broncos
 Shonan United BC
 Shinagawa City BC
 Tachikawa Dice
 Tokyo Hachioji Bee Trains
 Tokyo United BC
 Tryhoop Okayama
 Toyoda Gosei Scorpions
 Veltex Shizuoka
 Veertien Mie Basketball
 Yamaguchi Patriots
 Yokohama Excellence

Futsal (2022–23 F. League season)

F. League 
F1 League
 Bardral Urayasu
 Boaluz Nagano
 Borkbullet Kitakyushu
 Espolada Hokkaido
 Fugador Sumida
 Nagoya Oceans
 ASV Pescadola Machida
 Shonan Bellmare
 Shriker Osaka
 Tachikawa Athletic FC
 Vasagey Oita
 YSCC Yokohama

F2 League
 Agleymina Hamamatsu
 Deução Kobe
 Hiroshima F Do
 Ligarevia Katsushika
 Malva Mito
 Porseid Hamada
 Shinagawa City FC
 Vincedor Hakusan
 Voscuore Sendai

Rugby (2023 Japan Rugby League One season)

Japan Rugby League One 
Japan Rugby League One Division 1
 Black Rams Tokyo
 Green Rockets Tokatsu
 Hanazono Kintetsu Liners
 Kobelco Kobe Steelers
 Kubota Spears Funabashi Tokyo Bay
 Mitsubishi Sagamihara DynaBoars
 Saitama Wild Knights
 Shizuoka Blue Revs (formerly known as Yamaha Júbilo)
 Tokyo Sungoliath
 Toshiba Brave Lupus Tokyo
 Toyota Verblitz
 Yokohama Canon Eagles

Japan Rugby League One Division 2
 Hino Red Dolphins
 Kamaishi Seawaves
 Mie Honda Heat
 Shimizu Koto Blue Sharks
 Shining Arcs Tokyo-Bay Urayasu
 Toyota Industries Shuttles Aichi

Japan Rugby League One Division 3
 Chugoku Red Regulions
 Kurita Water Gush Akishima
 Kyuden Voltex (without city/prefecture in the name)
 NTT DoCoMo Red Hurricanes Osaka
 Skyactivs Hiroshima

Soccer (2023 J. League Season)

J League 
J1 League
 Albirex Niigata
 Avispa Fukuoka
 Cerezo Osaka
 Gamba Osaka
 Hokkaido Consadole Sapporo
 Kashima Antlers
 Kashiwa Reysol
 Kawasaki Frontale
 Kyoto Sanga
 Nagoya Grampus
 Sagan Tosu
 Sanfrecce Hiroshima
 Shonan Bellmare
 FC Tokyo
 Urawa Red Diamonds
 Vissel Kobe
 Yokohama FC
 Yokohama F. Marinos

J2 League
 Blaublitz Akita
 Fagiano Okayama
 Fujieda MYFC
 Iwaki FC
 JEF United Chiba
 Jubilo Iwata
 Machida Zelvia
 Mito HollyHock
 Montedio Yamagata
 Oita Trinita
 Omiya Ardija
 Renofa Yamaguchi
 Roasso Kumamoto
 Shimizu S-Pulse
 Thespakusatsu Gunma
 Tochigi SC
 Tokushima Vortis
 Tokyo Verdy
 V-Varen Nagasaki
 Vegalta Sendai
 Ventforet Kofu
 Zweigen Kanazawa

J3 League
 Azul Claro Numazu
 Ehime FC
 Fukushima United
 Gainare Tottori
 FC Gifu
 Giravanz Kitakyushu
 FC Imabari
 Iwate Grulla Morioka
 Kagoshima United
 Kamatamare Sanuki
 Kataller Toyama
 Matsumoto Yamaga
 Nagano Parceiro
 Nara Club
 FC Osaka
 FC Ryukyu
 SC Sagamihara
 Tegevajaro Miyazaki
 Vanraure Hachinohe
 Yokohama Sports & Culture Club

Volleyball (2022–23 V. League Season)

V. League 
Division 1 (V1)
 JTEKT Stings
 JT Thunders Hiroshima
 VC Nagano Tridents
 Oita Miyoshi Weisse Adler
 Panasonic Panthers
 Osaka Blazers Sakai
 Suntory Sunbirds
 Tokyo Great Bears
 Toray Arrows
 Wolfdogs Nagoya

Division 2 (V2)
 Aisin Tealmare
 Daido Special Steel Red Star
 Fujitsu Kawasaki Red Spirits
 Hyogo Delfino
 Kinden Trinity Blitz
 Safilva Hokkaido
 Saitama Azalea
 Tsukuba United Sun Gaia
 Veertien Mie
 Voreas Hokkaido

Division 3 (V3)
 Chiba Zelva
 Kinki Club Sfida
 Kubota Spears
 Nagoya GaRons
 Nara Dreamers
 Police Agency Fort Fighters
 Tokyo Verdy
 Toyota Mobility Tokyo Sparkle
 Toyota Motor Sunhawks

See also

 List of football clubs in Japan
 List of women's football clubs in Japan

References

:ja:日本のプロスポーツチーム一覧
Japan